Fronesis is a quarterly socialist and cultural magazine based in Malmö, Sweden. The magazine has been in circulation since 1998. Its subtitle is Politik. Teori. Kritik. (Swedish: Politics. Theory. Criticism.).

History and profile
Fronesis was established in 1998. Its headquarters is in Malmö. It is published on a quarterly basis. The magazine covers critical articles on politics, theory, and critique. It also features articles about culture.

In 2004 Fronesis was named as the cultural journal of the year in Sweden. In 2006 it became the member of Eurozine.

See also
 List of magazines in Sweden

References

External links
 

1998 establishments in Sweden
Cultural magazines
Magazines established in 1998
Mass media in Malmö
Political magazines published in Sweden
Quarterly magazines published in Sweden
Socialist magazines
Swedish-language magazines